Centrocoris is a genus of Coreidae family, subfamily Coreinae.

Species
Species within this genus include:
Centrocoris annae (Puton, 1874)
Centrocoris degener (Puton, 1874)
Centrocoris desertorum Linnavuori, 1960
Centrocoris inflaticeps Kiritshenko, 1916
Centrocoris marmottani Puton, 1887
Centrocoris orientalis Ahmad & Shadab, 1975
Centrocoris spiniger (Fabricius, 1781)
Centrocoris variegatus Kolenati, 1845
Centrocoris volxemi (Puton, 1878)

References 

Hemiptera of Europe
Coreini
Coreidae genera